Paytagt Shopping Center is an  shopping center and business tower located in the south-east Ashgabat, Turkmenistan. The building was designed and constructed by Turkish "Polimeks" in 2005. It consists of a 3-story base and 21-story tower.

References

External links

Ashgabat Photo Gallery.
Ashgabat Neutrality Arch.
Ashgabat Independence Monument

Shopping malls in Turkmenistan
Skyscrapers in Turkmenistan
Skyscraper office buildings